Ozeri is a surname. Notable people with the surname include:

Ahuva Ozeri (c. 1948–2016), Israeli singer
Yigal Ozeri (born 1958), Israeli artist
Gil Ozeri, American comedian, actor, and writer
Zion Ozeri (born 1951), Israeli-American photographer

Hebrew-language surnames